August Gremli (15 March 1833 – 30 March 1899) was a Swiss physician and botanist born in Kreuzlingen.

He studied medicine in Berlin and Munich, and afterwards, trained as a pharmacist in Karlsruhe. From 1876, he worked as a curator in the herbarium of botanist Émile Burnat (1828–1920) in Nant, located near the town of Vevey. He died in Kreuzlingen on March 30, 1899. 

Gremli published several works on Swiss flora, including Excursionsflora für die Schweiz (1867), a book that was later translated into English. In addition, he collaborated with Burnat on a number of essays involving flora from the Maritime Alps.

Selected publications 
 Excursionsflora für die Schweiz, 1867 (5th edition translated into English by Leonard W. Paitson as "The Flora of Switzerland" 1888)
 Beiträge zur Flora der Schweiz (Contributions to the Flora of Switzerland), 1870 
 Neue Beiträge zur Flora der Schweiz (New Contributions to the Flora of Switzerland), 1880-1890

References 
 Historischen Lexikon der Schweiz (biography)
 This article contains text based on a translation of an equivalent article at the German Wikipedia.

External links 
 IPNI List of plants described and co-described by Gremli.
 Stadtarchiv Schaffhausen Photo of August Gremli.

1833 births
1899 deaths
People from Kreuzlingen
19th-century Swiss botanists